South Sudanese Australians are people of South Sudanese ancestry or birth who live in Australia.

Demographics
Following South Sudan's independence in July 2011, the Australian Bureau of Statistics (ABS) included the country amongst the country of birth and ancestry options in the 2011 Census that took place in August. This census recorded 3,487 people born in South Sudan in Australia. However, the ABS note that "South Sudan-born were previously included in the Census count of the Sudan-born, and this is highly likely with a large number in the 2011 Census". Of the 3,487, the largest number were living in the state of Victoria (1,118), followed by Queensland (715), then New South Wales (561) and Western Australia (489). A total of 4,825 people indicated that they were of partial or full South Sudanese ancestry.

The 2016 census recorded 7,699 South Sudan-born people in Australia, with 2,750 living in Victoria, 1,430 in Queensland and 1,201 in Western Australia. 10,755 people indicated that they had partial or full South Sudanese ancestry.

The 2021 census recorded 8,255 people born in South Sudan. 14,273 people indicated that they had South Sudanese ancestry.

Notable South Sudanese Australians
Aweng Ade-Chuol, fashion model
Deng Adel, basketballer
Deng Adut, defence lawyer and New South Wales Australian of the Year for 2017
Adut Akech, international fashion model (April 2018 Vogue Italia and May 2018 British Vogue cover model)
DyspOra, Adelaide hip hop artist, poet, activist
Aliir Aliir, Australian rules footballer 
Kenny Athiu, football player
Bangs, hip hop artist
Nagmeldin 'Peter' Bol, middle distance runner and Olympian
 Elijah Buol, lawyer, criminologist and community advocate, 2019 winner of Queensland Local Hero of the Year 2019 Award and Order of Australia medal.
Mabior Chol, Australian rules footballer
Majak Daw, an Australian rules footballer playing for the Melbourne Football Club in the Australian Football League (AFL)
Ajak Deng, Australian fashion model (April 2016 Vogue Italia cover model)
Joseph Deng, middle distance runner
Majok Deng, basketballer
Peter Deng, football player
Thomas Deng, football player
Dor Jok, football player
Gordon Koang, blind popular musician
Subah Koj, Australian fashion model, one of the first two South Sudanese-Australians to walk in the Victoria's Secret Fashion Show
Alou Kuol, football player
Garang Kuol, football player
Jo Lual-Acuil Jr., basketballer
Awer Mabil, football player
Abraham Majok, football player
Ater Majok, basketballer
Thon Maker, basketballer
Mangok Mathiang, basketballer
Majak Mawith, football player
Kot Monoah, Melbourne lawyer, from Oct 2015 chairman of the South Sudanese Community Association of Victoria, previously community liaison officer.
Jackson Morgan, football player
Adau Mornyang, international fashion model
Nyadol Nyuon, lawyer and human rights advocate
Duckie Thot, Australian fashion model, one of the first two South Sudanese-Australians to walk in the Victoria's Secret Fashion Show
Ruon Tongyik, football player
Reuben William, Australian rules footballer
Kusini Yengi, football player
Tete Yengi, football player
Akiima Yong, Australian fashion model (April 2018 Vogue Australia cover model)
Valentino Yuel, football player
Friday Zico, South Sudanese international footballer

See also

 African Australians
 South Sudanese Americans
 South Sudanese Canadians

References

External links
 
 Sudanese Stories An oral history project recording the migration journeys and settlement experiences of southern Sudanese refugees now living in Blacktown, Western Sydney.

Ethnic groups in Australia
 
Immigration to Australia
South Sudanese diaspora
African Australian